The Foudre-class landing platform dock is a class of landing platform docks designed and constructed for the French Navy. Designated Transport de Chalands de Débarquement, they were intended to replace the ageing  and the construction of four vessels was planned. Only two were built and the remaining two were instead reordered as s. Replaced by the Mistrals, in 2011 Foudre was sold to the Chilean Navy and Siroco was sold to the Brazilian Navy in 2015.

Design and description
The Foudre class was designed to embark a mechanized regiment of the Rapid Action Force and act as its logistical support vessel once in theatre. The improvements included a higher speed, a hangar for helicopters, an elevator allowing for the quicker transfer of cargo between decks of the ship and side ramp embarkation, allowing for the loading of troops and vehicles from dockside. Due to delays in the procurement of the ships, the two vessels were built to slightly different layouts, with the second ship of the class,  incorporating a number of improvements later added to the first, . Foudre displaces  light,  standard,  at full load and  when flooded. Siroco has a displacement of  light,  at full load and  when flooded.

The vessels are both propelled by two controllable pitch propellers powered by two SEMT-Pielstick 16 PC 2.5 V400 diesel engines creating . The vessels also have a  bow thruster used primarily during amphibious operations. They are equipped with five 450 kW diesel generator sets creating a total of 4,250 kW of electricity. The ships have an endurance of 30 days at sea. The citadel is nuclear, biological and chemical protected.

Amphibious capability

The Foudre class carry large stowage areas which can be used to ferry battle tanks and vehicles. Each ship has a  docking well capable of stowing ten chaland de transport de matériel (CTMs) or one chaland de débarquement d'infanterie et de chars (CDIC)/engin de débarquement d'infanterie et de chars (EDIC) with four CTMs or two CDICs. They can also store two landing craft vehicle personnel suspended from davits abeam the aft part of the docking well. It takes a further 45 minutes to de-ballast. To aid in the quicker loading of the ship dockside, the vessels were given side-door loading capability.

The ships have permanent accommodation for 470 troops but can support up to 2,000 for three days. This can be extended by using the forward third of the well deck that is kept dry using a cofferdam. They also sport a  hospital area located beneath flight deck in order to ease transfer of casualties. The hospital facilities include two surgical operating suites and 47 beds. The ships also have repair and maintenance facilities.

Aircraft
The Foudre-class ships are equipped with a hangar capable of accommodating four Eurocopter Super Puma or two Aérospatiale Super Frelon helicopters. They each have a flight deck amidships capable of operating two Super Puma helicopters simultaneously. Foudres flight deck, measuring  has two landing spots but only one fitted with SAMAHE haul-down systems. Sirocos flight deck measures  after it was extended aft. Both ships can add an additional  landing spot on portable helicopter and vehicle stowage platform aft. Five ,  floatable sections can be added or lifted off by the 37/38-ton cranes. The vessels carry  of JP-5 aviation fuel.

Armament and sensors
Foudre was initially armed with two two-round Sadral launchers for Mistral surface-to-air missiles, one located to either side of the bridge and one  gun and two single-mounted  guns. The Sadral launchers were replaced with Simbad launchers and the number was later increased to three in Foudre with the third mount fitted atop the bridge. In 1998, the 40 mm and 20 mm guns were removed and replaced with  Breda-Mauser guns. The 30 mm guns can fire a  shell  and up to 800 rounds/minute. Siroco was equipped with the 30 mm guns during construction and received a third Simbad launcher in 2002. Both ships are equipped with four  machine guns.

Both ships received SENIT 8.01 with Link 11 reception and OPSMER command support systems. Two SAGEM VIGY-105 optronic fire control systems were installed for the 30 mm guns. They are equipped with Thomson-CSF DRBV 21A Mars air and surface search radar operating on the D band and a Racal Decca 2459 surface search radar operating on I band. For electronic warfare, the vessels mount Thales ARBB-36 jammer and SLQ-25 Nixie towed torpedo decoy systems. One of the DRBN 34A navigation radars is situated aft to aid in helicopter flight operations.

Ships

Construction and career

Three vessels were ordered as part of the 1984–1988 naval programme. Foudre was ordered 5 November 1984. However, budget issues delayed the construction of the following two hulls and they were deferred to later budgets. Eventually, Siroco was ordered on 11 April 1994 with the remaining two hulls from the previous order re-ordered as s. Both ships were constructed by DCN Brest, with Foudre entering service in 1990 and Siroco in 1998. Both ships were assigned to the Naval Action Force and based at Toulon. In 1999, Siroco was deployed to East Timor as part of the International Force for East Timor.

In June 2010, French defence minister Hervé Morin offered Foudre to the Argentine Navy during his visit to Buenos Aires. Argentina had already declined the transfer of the Ouragan-class vessels in the past and was more interested in seeking French support for a locally built amphibious ship instead. In 2010, Siroco was ordered to Haiti to support operations aiding the country after an earthquake devastated the country. 

Foudre was taken out of service by the French Navy in 2011. In October 2011 it was announced that Chile and France had finalized negotiations for sale of Foudre to Chile for around US$80 million. The official purchase date was 21 November 2011 and the ship was transferred on 23 December. Foudre entered service in the Chilean Navy as Sargento Aldea. The 2013 French White Paper on Defence and National Security said that Siroco would be decommissioned, a decision confirmed in October 2014. After negotiations with Portugal failed, Siroco was sold to Brazil in July 2015 and entered service with the Brazilian Navy as Bahia.

See also
  - British equivalent

Citations

References

Further reading

External links

 Naval-Technology

Amphibious warfare vessel classes

Ship classes of the French Navy